Qingnan may refer to:
Qingnan, the southern area of Qinghai Province, China
Qingnan Village, village in Gantian, Zhuzhou, Hunan, China
Liu Qingnan, Chinese grandmaster of chess